Access All Areas is the debut extended play (EP) by The AAA Girls, self-released on July 7, 2017.

Composition
"A Lacefront Like This" is a parody of "A Moment Like This" by Kelly Clarkson. "Heather?" is a parody of "We Belong Together" by Mariah Carey.

Promotion

"AAA Girls" served as the lead single. The EP was promoted by the Access All Areas Tour.

Track listing
 "AAA" – 3:13
 "A Lacefront Like This" – 3:47
 "Dear Uber Driver" – 3:03
 "Pride or Die" – 3:02
 "Heather?" (featuring Stacy Layne Matthews) – 3:15
 "Tuck Tape" – 2:38
 "When the Water Runs Clear" – 4:01
 "Meet & Greet" – 3:24

Charts

References

2017 debut EPs
Alaska Thunderfuck albums
Comedy albums by American artists
Comedy albums by Australian artists
LGBT-related albums
Willam Belli albums
Comedy EPs